Cindy Walters (born 1963) is an Australian architect and partner at Walters & Cohen in London, England.

She studied in South Africa before moving to London in 1990 where she worked at Foster & Partners. Walters & Cohen was established in 1994 with Michál Cohen.

Notable Appointments
Walter's and Cohen were appointed to design exemplary school prototypes for Tony Blair's Department for Education and Skills in 2003 and the Scottish Government's Scottish Futures Trust in 2012.

Notable Awards
In 2012, Cindy Walters and Michál Cohen together received the Architects' Journal inaugural Woman Architect of the Year Award. When presenting the award, the judge emphasized the "consistent quality of their architecture, combined with the ethos of the practice," commenting on their "active involvement with the RIBA and in teaching and examining at architecture schools". 70% of the Walters & Cohen's architectural staff were women at the time of the award.

References

External links 

Australian emigrants to the United Kingdom
Architects from London
Living people
1963 births